When All That's Left Is You is the first album created by Quietdrive, released through Epic Records.

The single "Rise from the Ashes" is featured on the soundtrack of both NHL 07 and ATV Offroad Fury Pro.

All of the songs on the album were written by lead singer Kevin Truckenmiller and Quietdrive, with the exception of Track 9, which is the cover of "Time After Time" by Cyndi Lauper.

Track listing
All songs written by Kevin Truckenmiller, except for where noted.
 "Rise from the Ashes" – 2:59
 "Get Up" – 3:34
 "Take a Drink" – 2:43
 "Let Me Go In" – 2:39
 "Rush Together" – 3:32
 "Maybe Misery" – 2:59
 "I Lie Awake" – 3:10
 "The Season" (Truckenmiller, Matt Kirby) – 3:01
 "Time After Time" (Cyndi Lauper, Rob Hyman) – 3:07
 "Both Ways" – 3:39

Singles
"Rise from the Ashes"
"Time After Time"

Personnel 
Butch Walker – Producer
Matt Kirkwold – Producer
James "Fluff" Harley - Engineer, Mixing
Chris Lord-Alge – Mixer
Kevin Truckenmiller – Vocals, Guitar, Fiddle
Matt Kirby – Vocals, Guitar
Justin Bonhiver – Guitar
Droo Hastings – Bass
Brandon Lanier – Drums
Walter Powell - Drums

References

2006 debut albums
Quietdrive albums
Epic Records albums
Albums produced by Butch Walker